George Virl Osmond Sr. (October 13, 1917November 6, 2007) was the patriarch of the singing Osmond family.

Life and career

Osmond was born in Etna, Wyoming, the son of Agnes LaVerna (née Van Noy) and Rulon Osmond. Rulon died at age 24 on November 24, 1917, shortly after George was born. A devout Mormon, Osmond served two missions for the Church of Jesus Christ of Latter-day Saints, one in Hawaii and the other in the United Kingdom. His grandfather, also named George Osmond, emigrated from England as a young adult and was an early leader in the Latter-day Saint community.

A World War II veteran, he married Olive May Davis on December 1, 1944. The two had nine children: George Jr. (Virl), Tom, Alan, Wayne, Merrill, Jay, Donny, Marie and Jimmy. Their first two children, Virl and Tom, were born with a degenerative condition which left them nearly deaf. Doctors warned the couple that future children had a higher chance of having a hearing loss, but George and Olive wanted a large family. All of their other children were born hearing.

He worked in real estate, insurance and as a postmaster for the city of Ogden, Utah. He loved to sing and he taught his children to sing barbershop harmony. The children's natural talent received public notice, which led to frequent appearances at church functions and local civil events. he managed his sons' careers, gaining an appearance at Disneyland in California. They caught the eye of Walt Disney, who took a personal interest in them. The boys auditioned for Andy Williams, whose show helped launch them into the national spotlight.

As his children's fortunes rose, Osmond put his career aside to focus on the family's musical interests. He moved the family to California to place them closer to the heart of the entertainment industry, then returned the family to Utah after they had broken through to mainstream fame. Jay Osmond described his father as strict, but not abusive, in that he held the Osmond Brothers to a high standard knowing that such professionalism was necessary for them to succeed.

In 2004, his wife Olive died shortly before the couple's 60th anniversary. In addition to their children and many grandchildren and great-grandchildren, their legacy was the Osmond Foundation, which later became the Children's Miracle Network, the largest charitable organization of its kind serving children's hospitals around the world.

On November 6, 2007, George died at his home in Provo, Utah, of natural causes. Affectionately known as "Father Osmond" to Osmond fans all over the world, he was buried in the East Lawn Memorial Hills Cemetery in Provo, Utah, beside his wife. Along with the nine children, he was survived by 55 grandchildren and 48 great-grandchildren.

Children
Osmond had nine children with his wife Olive:

George Virl Osmond Jr. (born October 19, 1945)
Thomas Rulon "Tom" Osmond (born October 26, 1947)
Alan Ralph Osmond (born June 22, 1949)
Melvin Wayne Osmond (born August 28, 1951)
Merrill Davis Osmond (born April 30, 1953)
Jay Wesley Osmond (born March 2, 1955)
Donald Clark "Donny" Osmond (born December 9, 1957)
Olive Marie Osmond (born October 13, 1959, sharing the same birthday with her father)
James Arthur "Jimmy" Osmond (born April 16, 1963)

References

External links
Official Osmond Family Site

Obituary in The Times, 8 November 2007
George Osmond, Osmond family patriarch, dies at 90 - CNN.com

1917 births
2007 deaths
20th-century Mormon missionaries
Latter Day Saints from Wyoming
American military personnel of World War II
American Mormon missionaries in the United States
Mormon missionaries in Hawaii
American Mormon missionaries in the United Kingdom
People from Lincoln County, Wyoming
People from Ogden, Utah
People from Provo, Utah
Military personnel from Wyoming
Osmond family (show business)
Latter Day Saints from Utah
Utah postmasters